Kintamani may refer to:

 Kintamani (dog), a dog native to the Indonesian island of Bali
 Kintamani, Bali, a village in Bali, Indonesia